The 2009 European Road Championships were held in Hooglede-Gits and Ostend, Belgium, between 1–5 July 2009. The event consisted of a road race and a time trial for men and women under 23 and juniors. The championships were regulated by the European Cycling Union.

Schedule

Individual time trial 
Wednesday 1 July 2009
 Men Juniors, 28.1 km
 Women U23, 28.1 km

Thursday 2 July 2009
 Women Juniors, 12.0 km
 Men U23, 37.0 km

Road race
Saturday 4 July 2009
 Men Juniors, 135.3 km
 Women U23, 135.3 km

Sunday 5 July 2009
 Women Juniors, 63.3 km
 Men U23, 175.5 km

Events summary

Countries
  Netherlands at the 2009 European Road Championships
  Sweden at the 2009 European Road Championships
incomplete list

Medal table

References

External links
The European Cycling Union

 
European Road Championships, 2009
Road cycling
European Road Championships by year
International cycle races hosted by Belgium